The Netherlands was represented by Willeke Alberti, with the song "Waar is de zon", at the 1994 Eurovision Song Contest, which took place in Dublin on 30 May. The song was chosen at the Dutch national final on 26 March.

Before Eurovision

Nationaal Songfestival 1994 
The final took place on 26 March 1994 at the AT&T Danstheater in The Hague, hosted by Paul de Leeuw. All eight songs were performed by Alberti, with the winner being decided by juries in the twelve Dutch provinces, who awarded votes as 10-8-6-5-4-3-2-1. "Waar is de zon" won by a 13-point margin, having been ranked first by six of the juries.

At Eurovision 
On the night of the final Alberti performed 13th in the running order, following Malta and preceding Germany. At the close of voting "Waar is de zon" had received 4 points, placing the Netherlands 23rd of the 25 entries, ahead only of newcomers Estonia and Lithuania. The Dutch jury awarded its 12 points to contest winners Ireland. The low placement meant relegation from the 1995 contest for the Netherlands; the first time the country would be forced to miss a contest due to poor results.

The Dutch conductor at the contest was Harry van Hoof for the 15th and last time.

Voting

References

External links 
 Netherlands preselection 1994

1994
Countries in the Eurovision Song Contest 1994
Eurovision